The Miami Dolphins Cheerleaders is the professional cheerleading squad of the Miami Dolphins of the National Football League. The squad performs a variety of dance moves at the Hard Rock Stadium, the home stadium of the Dolphins. The Dolphins Cheerleaders released an annual swimsuit calendar every year. The squad hosts auditions every May. Like most other squads in the league, the MDC also has a youth cheer squad and help mentor young girls in the Miami area. The squad also makes USO trips. Every year, the MDC sends a cheerleader to the Pro Bowl. The MDC also sends a number of alumni to the Indian Premier League every year.

History

The original squad was known as the Dolphins Dolls, consisting in 125 girls ranging from 8 to 18 years of age. The group performed in the Miami Orange Bowl until 1977. The professional group came around in 1978 under owner Joe Robbie, consisting of 30 ladies. The group was known as the Starbrites under a sponsorship with Starbrite Car Polish until 1983, when the sponsorship ended. The Dolphins made a deal with Burger King to hold a "Name the Cheerleaders" contest, and the Miami Dolphins Cheerleaders was ultimately selected. Many of the girls are considered to be very attractive. In 1990, founder June Taylor retired and was replaced by Kathy Morton Shashaty, who was a Dolphins cheerleader from 1981–1985. After the Dolphins was purchased by Wayne Huizenga, Heather Phillips was brought in to be the Director of Cheerleaders, while Emily Newton and Trisia Brown were hired to be the squad's coordinator and choreographer, respectively.

Notable members
Nadia Turner, (1996), Season 4 American Idol contestant
Suzy Tavarez, (1998–2000), On-Air Personality, Miami radio station Y100-FM
Shannon Ford, (2001), Miss Florida USA 2002, contestant on The Bachelor Season 3, Mrs. United States 2011 winner, Mrs. Florida America 2019, and Mrs. Universe 2021
Hennely Jimenez (2003–2004), Actress, 200 mph
Bibiana Julian, (2006–2009), contestant from The Bachelor.
Brenda Lowe, (2004–2005), contestant from Survivor: Nicaragua and Survivor: Caramoan; later appeared as a model on Deal or No Deal.
Jaime Faith Edmondson, (2004–2009), contestant from The Amazing Race in 2009 and 2011 (partnered with Cara Rosenthal, also a member).
Ashley White, (2007–2008), reporter of WYFF
Pamela Silva Conde, reporter and news anchor for Univision Network
Jeanette Dousdebes, wife of United States Senator from Florida, Marco Rubio
Brittany Freeman, Miss New Hampshire Teen USA 2004.
Mireya Mayor, National Geographic Wildlife Correspondent and History Channel's "Expedition:Africa" Wildlife Expert and Explorer.
LauRen Merola, Miss Pennsylvania USA 2008
Fabiola Romero, Original member of the FSU Cowgirls
Lilly Robbins, Maxim Model
Cara Rosenthal, contestant from The Amazing Race.
Natalie Vickers, news anchor of MountainWest Sports Network
MJ Acosta- Ruiz, NFL Network Anchor

References

External links

 Official website
 Miami Dolphins official website
 MDC Web Page on NFL Team History.com

Miami Dolphins
National Football League cheerleading squads
Performing groups established in 1978
Culture of Miami
1978 establishments in Florida
History of women in Florida